Artur Alliksaar (15 April 1923, in Tartu – 12 August 1966, in Tartu) was an Estonian poet.

Biography 
Alliksaar (formerly Alnek) attended elementary school in Tartu in 1931. In 1937, he enrolled in the prestigious secondary school: the Hugo Treffner Gymnasium. Afterwards, he worked for the railway, like his father, for a short period of time in 1942. That same year, he started to study law at the University of Tartu.

In 1943–1944, he served as a conscript in the Estonian Legion of Waffen-SS. In 1944, he saw combat on the Eastern Front against the Red Army. After the Soviet occupation, he joined the underground as a Forest Brother.

Eventually, he returned to Tartu and again worked for the railway. 
 
In 1949, the Soviet authorities arrested him for abusing his position. The charges were dubious. Alliksaar believes they were politically motivated. In 1954, he was also charged with betraying the homeland. Upon his release, in 1957, Alliksaar was not allowed to return to Estonia and lived in the Vologda oblast. In 1958, he secretly returned to Tartu and worked in a brewery, in construction and for the railway. He also dedicated himself to creative writing.

Artur Alliksaar suffered much injustice under Soviet authority. In addition to imprisonment, his house was burned down and he was forced to live in a shed with a dirt floor while his wife and son suffered with pneumonia.

Alliksaar died of colon cancer in 1966.

Creative life

In his poetry, Alliksaar celebrates individual freedom. His poems are innovative and critical of his era. Mainly, he wrote in free verse. His language is innovative and full of wordplay. Alliksaar is idolised by many. His creation is passionate, reckless and bohemian in nature.

Few of Alliksaar's poems were published during his lifetime; yet, he was well known. He wrote one play, Nimetu Saar (Nameless Island), which he lived to see in print. The complete collection of his poems, Päikesepillaja (Lavishing Sunshine), was published in 1997, and became a bestseller. He also translated poetry.

Sources

References

External links
 Artur Alliksaar at Estonian Writers' Online Dictionary

Estonian male poets
1923 births
1966 deaths
Writers from Tartu
Hugo Treffner Gymnasium alumni
20th-century Estonian poets
20th-century male writers
Soviet military personnel of World War II
Deaths from colorectal cancer
Deaths from cancer in Estonia